Cornerstone Schools is a group of private schools in Forsyth County, Georgia, United States, near Cumming. Established in 1999, the school group is located on a 30-acre wooded campus near Lake Lanier and Georgia Highway 400.

The preschool building opened in 2000. In 2001 a competition outdoor swimming pool and cabana opened. In March 2003 the first elementary school building opened. In 2005 the second elementary and middle school building opened.  In 2009 two athletic fields opened. In 2010 a new gym was built, which houses the school’s band and basketball team. As of 2010, the ground work for the new middle and high school building had been completed, however that site remains empty today.

References

External links

 Cornerstone Schools

Private high schools in Georgia (U.S. state)
Schools in Forsyth County, Georgia
Educational institutions established in 1999
Private middle schools in Georgia (U.S. state)
Private elementary schools in Georgia (U.S. state)
1999 establishments in Georgia (U.S. state)